The Origin is the debut album by the band The Origin, released in 1990. The single, "Growing Old", peaked at number 19 on the Billboard Modern Rock Tracks chart.

Release and reception 
The Origin was released on LP, CD and cassette on April 12, 1990 with 10 tracks featuring melodic alternative rock. Upon release, The Origin did not chart on the Billboard 200, but the singles were well received and played regularly on college and alternative radio at the time. Three of the album's tracks were released as singles, with one charting on the Billboard Modern Rock Tracks.

Allmusic gave the album an editor rating of 2.5 out of 5 stars, with Stanton Swihart stating... "For a debut, The Origin is certainly solid. Many of the songs are vigorous and rosy, and the band knew its way around a groove, particularly sprightly piano-led ones -- "Growing Old," "Everyone Needs Love"—that show a passing familiarity with Elton John but are much jauntier... Promising in the way of chops, The Origin nevertheless still had some growing to do before their next album."

Track listing
All songs written by The Origin.

note: *"Pull The Weight" segues into "One Of These Days", which is available as a stand-alone song found on the "Everyone Needs Love" 12" single.

Personnel

Musicians
 Michael Andrews – lead vocals, guitars
 Topper Rimel – bass guitar, background vocals
 Daniel Silverman – piano, keyboards, background vocals
 Rony Abada – drums

Production
 Produced by David Kershenbaum & Paul McKenna
 Engineered and Mixed by Paul McKenna except: "Growing Old," mixed by Kevin W. Smith
 Recorded at Powertrax, Hollywood
 Mixed at Scream, Los Angeles
 Second Engineers: Martin Lester, Craig Doubet
 Additional Engineering: John X. Volatis, Ross Hogarth
 Extra Percussion: Brian Kilgore
 Mastered by Bob Ludwig at Masterdisk
 Art Direction: Melanie Nissen
 Design: Steve Gerdes
 Photography: Annalisa

Singles

Music videos

External links

References

1990 debut albums
The Origin (band) albums